The Valle Germanasca is a valley in the Metropolitan City of Turin, Piedmont, north-western Italy run by the Germanasca stream, a right affluent of the Chisone. 

The valley, in the past affected by a strong depopulation, is now partially characterized by a tourist vocation, in particular for its landscape beauties. The main resort is Ghigo, a frazione of the comune of Prali, famous for its ski resort. Also visited are the Talc mines of the valley, which are of its resources and are still active.

Valle Germanasca is one of the Piedmontese valleys in which the majority of the population belongs to the Waldensian Evangelical Church.

Notable summits
Among the summits which surround the valley (all belonging to the Cottian Alps) there are:

 Gran Queyron - 3.060 m
 Bric Ghinivert - 3.037 m
 Monte Barifreddo - 3.028 m
 Bric Rosso (or Monte Politri) - 3.026 m
 Cima Frappier - 3.003 m
 Bric Bucie - 2.998 m
 Punta Vergia - 2.990 m
 Bric di Mezzogiorno - 2.986 m
 Monte Gran Mioul - 2.974 m
 Fea Nera - 2.946 m

Germanasca
Valleys of the Alps
Metropolitan City of Turin